Live 1964 is a live album by jazz pianist Horace Silver recorded on June 6, 1964, in "The Cork & Bib" nightclub in Westbury, Long Island, New York, on June 6, 1964 but released only in 1984 on the Emerald Records label.

Track listing

Personnel
The Horace Silver Quintet
Horace Silver – piano, liner notes
Teddy Smith – bass
Roger Humphries – drums
Joe Henderson – tenor sax
Carmell Jones – trumpet

Production
Sylvester Brown – cover design
Jim Mooney – engineer
Hans Horzheim – photography 
William Glaser – recording

References

1984 live albums
Horace Silver live albums